Hillsboro High School may refer to any of several high schools in the United States:

Hillsboro High School (Illinois)
Hillsboro High School (Kansas)
Hillsboro High School (Missouri)
Hillsboro High School (New Mexico), a historic building
Hillsboro High School (North Dakota), Hillsboro, North Dakota
Hillsboro High School (Ohio)
Hillsboro High School (Oregon)
Hillsboro High School (Tennessee), Nashville
Hillsboro High School (Texas)
Hillsboro High School (Wisconsin), a high school in Wisconsin
Hillsboro-Deering High School, Hillsborough, New Hampshire